The Gossner College is one of oldest institutions formed by the Gossner Evangelical and Lutheran Church. It is a minority college affiliated to  Ranchi University.

History
Governed by Gossner Evangelical and Lutheran Church of Chotanagpur and Assam was established in 1971 with the prime objective of giving the Tribal Christian young men and women as well as socially, economically backward and underprivileged and privileged communities of this region, namely the Scheduled Tribes, the Scheduled Caste and other backward classes an opportunity of higher education in a Christian atmosphere. It is one of the premier centres of higher education in the state.
It provides Intermediate and Undergraduate Learning Programmes in science, commerce and arts.

See also
Education in India
Ranchi University
Literacy in India
List of institutions of higher education in Jharkhand

References

External links
 http://www.gcran.org/

Universities and colleges in Jharkhand
Colleges affiliated to Ranchi University
Universities and colleges in Ranchi
1971 establishments in Bihar
Educational institutions established in 1971